Calathus montivagus is a species of ground beetle from the Platyninae subfamily that can be found in Italy and Sicily.

References

montivagus
Beetles described in 1831
Beetles of Europe